A Thousand Lire a Month (Italian: Mille lire al mese) is a 1939 Italian "white-telephones" comedy film directed by Max Neufeld and starring Alida Valli, Umberto Melnati and Osvaldo Valenti. It is a remake of the 1936 Hungarian film Havi 200 fix. The plot concerns an electronic engineer who goes to Budapest, accompanied by his girlfriend, to work on experiments for a new television system leading to countless mix-ups.

It was shot at the Safa Palatino Studios in Rome. The film's sets were designed by the art director Ottavio Scotti.

Cast
 Alida Valli as Magda 
 Umberto Melnati as Matteo 
 Osvaldo Valenti as Gabriele Corodi 
 Renato Cialente as Il direttore generale della Radio di Budapest 
 Niní Gordini Cervi as Lilli 
 Giuseppe Pierozzi as Axel, il capo del personale 
 Anna Doré as Lia Loletta 
 Amina Pirani Maggi as La madre di Magda 
 Maria Polese as La zia di Magda 
 Fausto Guerzoni as Leopoldo Almos 
 Vasco Creti as Il padrone della farmacia 
 Armando Arzalesi
 Aristide Baghetti as Il padrino con il monocolo 
 Luigi Erminio D'Olivo as L'ingegnere in attesa di diventare padre 
 Carlo Lombardi as Il ministro 
 Renato Malavasi as Un tecnico televisivo 
 Livia Minelli as Francesca, la cameriera 
 Lina Tartara Minora as La padrona della pensione di Almos 
 Sergio Pastorini as Il tenore 
 Cesare Polacco as Carletto, l'altro padrino 
 Adriano Rimoldi as Un impiegato della radio 
 Dina Romano as La donna con il mal di denti 
 Felice Romano as Un altro tecnico televisivo 
 Gennaro Sabatano
 Elettra Terzolo as Caterina, la cameriera

References

Bibliography
 Nowell-Smith, Geoffrey & Hay, James & Volpi, Gianni. The Companion to Italian Cinema. Cassell, 1996.

External links 

1939 films
Italian comedy films
1939 comedy films
1930s Italian-language films
Films directed by Max Neufeld
Films set in Budapest
Remakes of Hungarian films
Italian remakes of foreign films
Italian black-and-white films
Films shot at Palatino Studios
1930s Italian films